Deh-e Ali Khan may refer to:
 Deh-e Ali Khan, Markazi
 Deh-e Ali Khan, Sistan and Baluchestan
 Deh-e Ali Khan, alternate name of Ali Khan, Sistan and Baluchestan